Bara vi och månen is a 1997 studio album by Swedish dansband Grönwalls.

Track listing
Bara vi och månen
Säj minns du parken
Om du ger mej tid
Funny How Time Slips Away
Mr Magic
Vad en kvinna vill ha
Ge mej en kyss
Itsy Bitsy
Jag har en dröm
Akta dej vad du är min
Älskat dig i smyg
I vems famn
Jag har plats i mitt hjärta
Kärleken är

Charts

References 

1997 albums
Grönwalls albums
Swedish-language albums